Balthasar Niederkofler (10 November 1906 – 11 April 1989) was an Austrian cross-country skier who competed in the 1930s. He won a bronze medal in the 4 x 10 km at the 1933 FIS Nordic World Ski Championships in Innsbruck.

External links
World Championship results 

1906 births
1989 deaths
Austrian male cross-country skiers
FIS Nordic World Ski Championships medalists in cross-country skiing
20th-century Austrian people